Wolfskin is a three-issue comic book limited series, published 2006 and 2007 by Avatar Press. It is written by Warren Ellis, with art by Juan Jose Ryp. From 2010 to 2011, a second six-issue comic book limited series, titled Wolfskin: Hundredth Dream was published.

It is a fantasy comic combining sword and sorcery themes (like those in Conan) with elements from historical fantasy sources (including Norse sagas and chambara).

Publication history
Ellis released Wolfskin Annual #1 with co-author Mike Wolfer and art by Gianluca Pagliarani. This set up the scene for a new six-issue Wolfskin limited series.

In 2010, Avatar Press began publishing a new 6-issue limited series titled Wolfskin: Hundredth Dream with story by Warren Ellis, script by Mike Wolfer, and art by Gianluca Pagliarani.

Collected editions
The series has been collected into two trade paperbacks:

Wolfskin Volume 1 (120 pages, limited edition hardcover, October 2009, softcover)
Wolfskin Volume 2: Hundredth Dream (160 pages, softcover)

Notes

References

External links